Lewsey Park is a suburb of Luton, in the Luton district, in the ceremonial county of Bedfordshire, England. Situated in the north-west of the town, the area is roughly bounded by Woodside Link to the North, Leagrave High Street to the south, Pastures Way to the west, and the M1 to the east.

History
Lewsey Park takes its name from the public park within its boundaries, which is also called Lewsey Park. The parkland takes its name from the neighbouring suburb of Lewsey, which in turn takes its name from a corruption of the “Lucy” family. The Lucy family owned the manor to which the land belonged from 1305 to 1455.

Lewsey Park was built in the late 1980s and 1990s infilling between Hockwell Ring and Lewsey Farm.  It is characterised by the many closed and dead end roads of that era of estate design. More open than areas built in previous decades, Lewsey Park consists of mainly detached and semi-detached large houses, many with dorma windows or a tiled upper front façade.

Local area 
At the centre of the area is a leisure centre called Lewsey Sports Park, which houses a swimming pool, gym, sports hall and café. Next door is The Club, a bar and club for the community. Across the road there is also a corner shop. In the south of the area is Lewsey Park (confusingly given the same name as the suburb which surrounds it). The park is a large area containing sports pitches, allotments and a play park. Lewsey Brook is a temporal water course which is a minor tributary to the River Lea and passes through the park.

Schools 
St. Martin de Porres Catholic Primary School

Politics
Lewsey Park is part of the larger Lewsey ward, which also includes Lewsey Farm and Lewsey. The ward is represented by Cllr Jacqui Burnett (Labour), Cllr Aslam Khan (Labour) and Council leader Cllr Hazel Simmons (Labour).

The ward forms part of the parliamentary constituency of Luton North and the MP is Sarah Owen (Labour).

Local attractions

Local newspapers
Two weekly newspapers cover Lewsey Park, although they are not specific to the area.

They are the:
 Herald and Post
 Luton News

References

Areas of Luton